Kanawata Aeroparc  is located  south southwest of Kanawata, near Lake Manouane, Quebec, Canada.

References

Registered aerodromes in Mauricie